Phlomoides, also called Jerusalem sage and Lampwick plant, is a genus of over 130 species of flowering plants in the family Lamiaceae, native from the Mediterranean region east across central Asia to China. Phlomoides now comprises the former Notochaete hamosa, many former species of the genera Phlomis and Eremostachys and all of Lamiophlomis and Pseuderemostachys.

Species
Species include:
Phlomoides alpina
Phlomoides azerbaijanica
Phlomoides betonicoides
Phlomoides bracteosa
Phlomoides fulgens
Phlomoides hamosa
Phlomoides koraiensis – Korean Jerusalem sage
Phlomoides macrophylla – Maximowicz's Jerusalem sage
Phlomoides maximowiczii
Phlomoides melanantha
Phlomoides milingensis
Phlomoides oreophila
Phlomoides ornata
Phlomoides pratensis
Phlomoides pulchra
Phlomoides rotata
Phlomoides sewerzovii
Phlomoides spectabilis
Phlomoides superba
Phlomoides tianschanica
Phlomoides tuberosa
Phlomoides umbrosa – shady Jerusalem sage
Phlomoides younghusbandii

References

Lamiaceae genera
Lamiaceae